Stirpnik is a small settlement in the Municipality of Škofja Loka in the Upper Carniola region of Slovenia.

References

External links
Stirpnik at Geopedia

Populated places in the Municipality of Škofja Loka